The 2006–07 Notre Dame Fighting Irish men's basketball team represented the University of Notre Dame during the college basketball season of 2006-07, competing in the Big East Conference. The team was led by seventh-year head coach, Mike Brey, and played their home games in the Edmund P. Joyce Center in Notre Dame, Indiana.

Notre Dame began the season playing an out of conference schedule that included the Paradise Jam tournament and reached their conference games with a 12–1 record. The team finished the season ranked 17th in the Associated Press (AP) Poll, and had a 24–8 record overall (11–5 Big East).

Roster

Schedule and results

|-
!colspan=9 style=| Regular season

|-
!colspan=9 style=| Big East tournament

|-
!colspan=9 style=| NCAA tournament

Rankings

References

Notre Dame
Notre Dame Fighting Irish men's basketball seasons
Notre Dame
Fight
Fight